Allen McClure (March 17, 1935 – August 12, 2007) was an American sailor. He competed in the Dragon event at the 1960 Summer Olympics.

References

External links
 

1935 births
2007 deaths
American male sailors (sport)
Olympic sailors of the United States
Sailors at the 1960 Summer Olympics – Dragon
Sportspeople from New Orleans